The Romanian Border Police is the structure of the Romanian Ministry of Internal Affairs responsible for the border security and passport control at border crossing points, airports and ports.

Structure 
Since 2001 multiple restructures and improvements occurred in order to align the service to the European counterparts. Currently it is composed of the Border Police General Inspectorate which is the central structure, subordinated to the Ministry of Internal Affairs, while the second tier is composed of the 5 Territorial Inspectorates (Giurgiu, Timișoara, Oradea, Sighetu Marmației, Iași) and the Coast Guard. The latter was formed in 2011 when the County Inspectorates of Constanța and Tulcea were reorganized into the newly formed Coast Guard.

Ranks
The Border Police uses the same ranking system as the Romanian Police, with different colors. (see Romanian Police)

Before 2002, the Border Police had military status and a military ranking system, within the Ministry of Internal Affairs (see Romanian Armed Forces ranks and insignia). In June 2002 it became a civilian police force, together with the National Police (the first police service in Eastern Europe to do so) and its personnel was structured into two corps:

Corpul ofițerilor de poliție (Police Officers Corps) - corresponding to the commissioned ranks of a military force, to the ranks of Inspector, Superintendent and Commissioner in a British-style police force or to the both Corps de conception et de direction and Corps de commande et d'encadrement in the French National Police (Police Nationale).

Corpul agenților de poliție (Police Agents Corps) - corresponding to the non-commissioned ranks of a military force, to the Corps de maîtrise et d'application in the French National Police or to the ranks of Constable or Sergeant in a British-style police force.

Weapons and Equipment

Fleet

Current fleet

 1 OPV 950 class: 950 tons built by Damen Group, at the Galați Shipyard.
MAI 0201 Ștefan cel Mare (ex MAI 1105)
2 FCS 4008 class: 300 tons built by Damen Group, at the Damen Shipyards Antalya
MAI 1006, 1007
4 Neustadt class patrol boat: 218 tons ex-German Federal Border Guard, built by Lürssen shipyard in Bremen-Vegesack, Germany.
MAI 1101, 1102, 1103, 1104 (ex BG-12 Bad Bramstedt, BG-15 Eschwege, BG-16 Alsfeld, BG-17 Bayreuth)
2 Bigliani class patrol boat: 90 tons ex-Guardia di Finanza, built by Intermarine, Italy.
MAI 2113, 2114 (ex G.80 Bigliani, G.81 Cavaglià)
3 Shaldag Mk IV class patrol boat: 72 tons built by Israel Shipyards in Haifa, Israel.
MAI 2110, 2111, 2112 

5 Patrol 1850 boat: 30 tons built by Kewatec Finland.
 MAI 3063, 3064, 3065, 3066, 3067
5 SNR-17 class patrol boat: 25 tons built by Istanbul Shipyard, Turkey.
MAI 3057, 3058, 3059, 3060, 3061
 various small coastal and riverine vessels, hovercraft, pontoons, etc.

Historic ships
 VG-10 class patrol boat: built in Santierul Naval Braila in 1953–1954 years.

UAVs
Schiebel Camcopter S-100 - made available by the European Maritime Safety Agency - EMSA

Future prospects

On March 10, 2021, a contract was signed for Damen Group to supply the border police with two FCS 4008 Patrol boats.  They will replace some of the ageing Neustadt Class boats, vessels which were built during 1969-1970 for the German Federal Border Guard, the first one being bought by the Romanian Border Police in 2002 and the other 3 in 2005. Previous attempts to replace them have failed, mainly because of lack of funding.

See also
 Romanian Police
 Romanian Gendarmerie
 Ministry of Internal Affairs

References

External links

 Official site

Border guards
Borders of Romania